New York's 29th congressional district is an obsolete congressional district for the United States House of Representatives which most recently included a portion of the Appalachian mountains in New York known as the "Southern Tier." It was most recently represented by Tom Reed. This district number became obsolete for the 113th Congress in 2013 as a result of the 2010 Census. Most of the former 29th district remained intact and was to be renumbered as the 23rd district.

Voting

Components
The 29th district was centered in Buffalo and Niagara Falls in the 1990s (represented by John LaFalce); that district was dismantled and parceled out to the present 27th and 28th Districts. In the 1980s this district was centered in suburban Rochester. During the 1970s the district was congruent to the present upper Hudson Valley 20th District.

The far southern tier district was numbered the 31st District in the 1990s and the 34th District in the 1980s, when Amo Houghton represented it. During the 1970s this area was primarily in the 39th District. Prior versions of this district included Chautauqua county; suburban Rochester had never been in a southern tier district until the 2002 remap. The result was that the district changed from a "packed" Republican district to a "cracked" district. The 2008 elections reversed the crack, meaning that the heavily Democratic and suburban Monroe County votes were able to swing the district in their favor, leaving most of the rest of the expansive district out of influence, though not without help from an unexplained vote shift in Cattaraugus County. Former Corning Mayor Tom Reed, a Republican, was sworn in on Nov. 18, 2010 to fill out the term of Democrat Eric Massa, who resigned. Reed was elected to a full two-year term in the 112th Congress.

1913–1945:
All of Saratoga, Warren, Washington
Parts of Rensselaer

1945–1953:
All of Delaware, Orange, Rockland, Sullivan

1953–1963:
All of Columbia, Dutchess, Greene, Schoharie, Ulster

1963–1969:
All of Albany, Schenectady
Parts of Rensselaer

1969–1971:
All of Albany, Schenectady

1971–1973:
All of Schenectady
Parts of Albany, Montgomery

1973–1983:
All of Greene, Rensselaer, Saratoga, Warren, Washington
Parts of Albany, Columbia, Essex

1983–1993:
All of Cayuga, Oswego, Seneca, Wayne
Parts of Monroe, Oneida

1993–2003:
All of Niagara, Orleans
Parts of Erie, Monroe

2003–2013:
All of Allegany, Cattaraugus, Chemung, Schuyler, Steuben, Yates
Parts of Monroe, Ontario

List of members representing the district

Recent election results
Following are the results of the elections of 1996 through 2008.

In New York State electoral politics there are numerous minor parties at various points on the political spectrum. Certain parties will invariably endorse either the Republican or Democratic candidate for every office. Therefore, the state electoral results contain both the party votes, and the final candidate votes (Listed as "Recap").

See also
 Tom Reed (politician)
 Eric Massa
 Amo Houghton

References

 
 
 Congressional Biographical Directory of the United States 1774–present
 New York State Board of Elections 2008 Election Results
 2006 Election Statistics (House), Clerk of the House of Representatives
 2006 House election data
 2004 House election data
 2002 House election data
 2000 House election data
 1998 House election data
 1996 House election data

External links
 All about New York's 29th Congressional District, via Fighting29th.com

29
Former congressional districts of the United States
Constituencies established in 1823
Constituencies disestablished in 2013
1823 establishments in New York (state)
2013 disestablishments in New York (state)